Love & Mercy is the seventh studio album by Christian singer-songwriter Kathy Troccoli. It was released on April 29, 1997 on Reunion Records. The lead single "Love One Another" features Troccoli and 40 plus Christian artists like Amy Grant, Sandi Patty, Michael W. Smith and Carman. The song was released commercially as a CD single on March 18, 1997 to Christian retail stores in advance of the album's release and the single's proceeds went to His Touch Ministries in Houston, Texas, which is a non-profit organization that was established to educate the church, provide support groups for HIV victims, create teams to visit AIDS patients and provide housing for men, women and children suffering from the illness. The album's third single "A Baby's Prayer" is a pro-life song that Troccoli and Scott Brasher wrote that explores the abortion issue from the perspective of an unborn child. "A Baby's Prayer" would give Troccoli her first two Dove Award wins for Inspirational Song of the Year (one as artist, the other as writer, shared with co-writer Brasher) at the 29th GMA Dove Awards. Love & Mercy reached number 7 on the Top Christian Albums, number 6 on the Heatseekers Albums and number 170 on the Top 200 Albums charts in Billboard magazine, giving Troccoli her first crossover chart appearance on the latter.

Track listing 
"I Call Him Love" (Ty Lacy, Kevin Stokes, Joanna Carlson) - 4:07
"Water into Wine" (Grant Cunningham, Matt Huesmann) - 3:38
"Love One Another" (Kathy Troccoli, Bill Cuomo, Robert White Johnson) - 5:47
"How Would I Know" (Jackie Gouché-Ferris) - 5:01
"A Baby's Prayer" (Troccoli, Scott Brasher) - 3:49
"He'll Never Leave Me" (Dawn Thomas) - 5:25
"All Glory to God" (Troccoli, Cuomo, Johnson) - 3:55
"Faithful to Me" (Troccoli) - 3:57
"Call Out to Me" (Diane Warren) - 3:51
"Help Me God" (Allen Shamblin, Madeline Stone) - 2:51

Charts

Radio singles

Accolades 
GMA Dove Awards

References 

1997 albums
Kathy Troccoli albums
Reunion Records albums